Andrés Gómez and Mark Woodforde were the defending champions, but lost to John and Patrick McEnroe in the final, 6–4, 5–7, [7–10].

Draw

Final

Group C
Standings are determined by: 1. number of wins; 2. number of matches; 3. in three-players-ties, percentage of sets won, or of games won; 4. steering-committee decision.

Group D
Standings are determined by: 1. number of wins; 2. number of matches; 3. in three-players-ties, percentage of sets won, or of games won; 4. steering-committee decision.

References
Main Draw

Legends Over 45 Doubles